A695 road is a road in Northern England linking Newcastle upon Tyne, Tyne and Wear, with Hexham, Northumberland.

Motorway
It was part of the proposed A695(M) Shields Road Motorway.

References

Roads in England
Transport in Northumberland
Transport in Tyne and Wear